Lewvan is an unincorporated community in Scott Rural Municipality No. 98 in the province of Saskatchewan, Canada. Located on highway 306, approximately 53 km northwest of the city of Weyburn. The community was named by the Grand Trunk Railway after Louis W. Van Morristran, the original owner of the town site in 1902, in 1911 the Grand Trunk laid out the town of Lewvan.

Transportation
Highways 306, 621, and 710 pass through Lewvan. To the southeast is the Lewvan (Farr Air) Airport which supports local air traffic.

See also
 List of communities in Saskatchewan

References

Unincorporated communities in Saskatchewan
Scott No. 98, Saskatchewan
Division No. 2, Saskatchewan